Władysław Strzemiński (21 November 1893 – 26 December 1952) was a Polish avant-garde painter of international renown.

Life and work
Strzemiński was born in Minsk to an ethnic Polish family. In 1914, he graduated from the Military School of Civil Engineering. During World War I he served as second lieutenant at the Osowiec Fortress. In 1915 he was severely wounded in the Attack of the Dead Men. In 1920 he married Katarzyna Kobro.

In 1922 he moved to Wilno (now Vilnius), and in the following year supported Vytautas Kairiūkštis in creating the first avant-garde art exhibition in what is now the territory of Lithuania (then under Polish rule).

In November 1923 he moved to Warsaw, where with Henryk Berlewi he founded the constructivist group Blok.

During the 1920s he formulated his theory of Unism (Unizm in Polish). His paintings inspired the musical compositions of the Polish composer Zygmunt Krauze. He is an author of a revolutionary book titled "The theory of vision." He was co creator of unique avant-garde art collection in Łódź gathered together thanks to the enthusiasm of members of the “a.r.” group as Katarzyna Kobro and Henryk Stażewski (the artists) and Julian Przyboś and Jan Brzękowski (the poets).

In postwar Łódź he was an instructor at the Higher School of Plastic Arts and Design Neoplastic Room in Muzeum Sztuki in Łódź, where one of his students was Halina Ołomucki, survivor of the Nazi concentration camps. His Neoplastic Room was installed in the Muzeum Sztuki in Łódź in 1948 but was removed in 1950 as it failed to fit in with the socialist realism aesthetic imposed by Włodzimierz Sokorski, the minister of culture of the Polish United Workers' Party.

His works have been exhibited in such museums around the world as Centre Pompidou, Museo Reina Sofia, Moderna Museet Malmö and Whitechapel Gallery.

In film
He is the subject of Afterimage (2016), the final film by Andrzej Wajda.

Selected paintings

References

Bibliography 
Władysław Strzemiński. Readability of Images. Proceedings of the international conference devoted to the work of Władysław Strzemiński,  13–14 October 2011, Muzeum Sztuki, Łódź 2015.
Władysław Strzemiński 1893–1952. On the 100th Anniversary of His Birth, Muzeum Sztuki w Łodzi, Łódź 1993.

External links
Biography
Essays on Władysław Strzemiński
Work Information
International Collection of Modern Art of the “a.r.” group

1893 births
1952 deaths
20th-century Polish painters
20th-century Polish male artists
Artists from Minsk
Polish male painters
Russian military personnel of World War I